
Gmina Łopiennik Górny is a rural gmina (administrative district) in Krasnystaw County, Lublin Voivodeship, in eastern Poland.

Villages
Gmina Łopiennik Górny contains the villages and settlements of Borowica, Dobryniów, Dobryniów-Kolonia, Gliniska, Krzywe, Łopiennik Dolny, Łopiennik Dolny-Kolonia, Łopiennik Górny, Łopiennik Nadrzeczny, Łopiennik Podleśny, Majdan Krzywski, Nowiny, Olszanka, Wola Żulińska and Żulin.

Neighbouring gminas
Gmina Łopiennik Górny is bordered by the gminas of Fajsławice, Gorzków, Krasnystaw, Rejowiec, Rejowiec Fabryczny, Rybczewice and Trawniki.

References

Polish official population figures 2006

Lopiennik Gorny
Krasnystaw County